Robert O'Leary (born 19 June 1967) is an Irish racewalker. He competed in the men's 20 kilometres walk at the 1992 Summer Olympics.

References

External links
 

1967 births
Living people
Athletes (track and field) at the 1992 Summer Olympics
Irish male racewalkers
Olympic athletes of Ireland
Place of birth missing (living people)